The South Sandwich Plate or Sandwich Plate is a minor tectonic plate bounded by the subducting South American Plate to the east, the Antarctic Plate to the south and the Scotia Plate to the west. The plate is separated from the Scotia Plate by the East Scotia Rise, a back arc spreading ridge formed by the subduction zone on its eastern margin. The South Sandwich Islands are located on this small plate.

References 

 The South Sandwich Microplate
Kurt Stüwe: Geodynamics of the Lithosphere: An Introduction Springer; 2nd edition (2007) p390 

Tectonic plates
Geology of the Atlantic Ocean